WGCM (1240 AM) is radio station licensed to Gulfport, Mississippi. It airs an oldies format and is owned by JMD, Inc.

History
WGCM began broadcasting in 1928 and was owned by Gulf Coast Music Co. It briefly broadcast at 1350 kHz, before its frequency was changed to 1210 kHz later in 1928. Its frequency was changed to 1240 kHz in March 1941, as a result of the North American Regional Broadcasting Agreement. By 1944, WGCM had become an affiliate of the Blue Network, which would become the American Broadcasting Company in 1945.

In 1980, its call sign was changed to WTAM. The station aired an urban contemporary format as WTAM. Its call sign was changed back to WGCM in 1987, and it adopted a country music format. By 1990, the station had adopted to an adult standards format. By 1994, it had switched to a sports format. In 1995, it adopted a classic country format. In 2016, the station began to be simulcast on a translator at 100.9 MHz, and it adopted an oldies format branded "Cruisin' WGCM".

Translator
WGCM is also heard at 100.9 MHz, through a translator in Gulfport, Mississippi.

References

External links

GCM
Oldies radio stations in the United States
Radio stations established in 1928
1928 establishments in Mississippi